"It's Hard to Be a Saint in the City" is a song written and performed by Bruce Springsteen on his debut album Greetings from Asbury Park, N.J. in 1973.  It is about a young man growing up on the streets of a city, and who is trying to stay good and do what he believes is right. Unfortunately, he is inexorably dragged into some very unsaintly activities. A 1975 live version can be found on the DVD of the Hammersmith Odeon concert that is included in the Born to Run (30th Anniversary Edition) and the Hammersmith Odeon London '75 CDs.  A 1978 live version is included in the Live/1975–85 set. The song has also been covered by David Bowie. John Sayles included this song in a high school lunchroom scene of his movie Baby It's You.

This is the song that impressed producer Mike Appel so much that he quit his job to become Springsteen's manager, even though Springsteen did not have a record contract yet. This was also the first song Springsteen played at his audition at CBS Records for John Hammond, who eventually signed him to a record contract, on May 2, 1972. The following day, Springsteen recorded "It's Hard to Be a Saint in the City" as part of a 12-song demo for Hammond. The demo version of the song was released on Tracks in 1998. The version included on Greetings from Asbury Park, N.J. was recorded during the summer of 1972 backed by future E-Street Band members David Sancious on piano, Vini Lopez on drums and Garry Tallent on bass.

Personnel
According to authors Philippe Margotin and Jean-Michel Guesdon:
 Bruce Springsteen – vocals, acoustic guitar
 Vini "Mad Dog" Lopez – drums
 Gary Tallent – bass
 David Sancious – piano

References

External links
 It's Hard To Be A Saint In The City: brucespringsteen.net

1973 songs
Bruce Springsteen songs
Songs written by Bruce Springsteen
Song recordings produced by Mike Appel